Herbert Neville Bewley C.B.E., J.P. (1890–1966) was a British Lawyer and politician who served as Lord Mayor of Liverpool.
 
Bewley was born in Birkenhead, Cheshire in 1890.  He was educated at Liverpool College and Wadham College, Oxford. He was elected to Liverpool City Council on 1 November 1931 as Conservative for Much Woolton Ward.

He was made a Justice of the Peace in 1944.  He was appointed Commander, Order of the British Empire (C.B.E.) in the New Years Honours 1956. He lived in Crosby on Hall Road West

He served as Lord Mayor of Liverpool from 1959–60.

See also

 1931 Liverpool City Council election
 Liverpool City Council elections 1880–present
 Liverpool City Council
 Mayors and Lord Mayors of Liverpool 1207 to present

References

1890 births
1966 deaths
Mayors of Liverpool
Commanders of the Order of the British Empire